Hinrichshagen is a village and a former municipality in the Mecklenburgische Seenplatte district, in Mecklenburg-Vorpommern, Germany. Since 1 January 2012, it is part of the municipality Peenehagen.

References

Former municipalities in Mecklenburg-Western Pomerania